Nicky Pellegrino (born 1964) is a novelist. She is an English-born New Zealander of Italian descent and lives and writes in Auckland, New Zealand. Her novels have been translated into 12 languages.

Early life 
Pellegrino was born in Liverpool in the north-west of England to an Italian father and English mother. The family spent summer holidays with her father's siblings in southern Italy, experiences which later became the inspiration for some of her books. She studied English at the University of Lancaster, completing a BA (Honours) degree

Career 
After graduating, Pellegrino moved to London and worked on women’s and entertainment magazines. In 1994 she moved to Auckland and became deputy editor, and then editor of New Zealand Woman’s Weekly. She has also worked as the editor of a bridal magazine, and was the books editor for the Herald on Sunday newspaper for seven years. Pellegrino writes articles for the New Zealand Listener, Next Magazine, NZ Gardener and Food Magazine, and has a regular book column in the New Zealand Woman’s Weekly.

She began writing her first novel in 2001, when her friend Angela D'Audney was diagnosed with a brain tumour at the age of 56. Pellegrino was moved to begin on a long-held dream of writing a novel, and wrote Delicious while co-writing D'Audney's autobiography.

Publications 
 Angela: A Wonderful Life! (2001), co-author with Angela D'Audney, Penguin
 Delicious (2005), Orion Books
 Summer at the Villa Rosa (2007), Orion Books
 The Italian Wedding (2009), Orion Books
 Recipe for Life (2010), Orion Books 
 The Food of Love Cookery School (2013), Orion Books
 One Summer in Venice (2015), Orion Books
 The Villa Girls (2011), Orion Books
 When in Rome (2012), Orion Books
 Under Italian Skies (2016), Orion Books
 A Dream Of Italy (2019), Orion Books
 Tiny Pieces of Us (2020), Hachette New Zealand

References

1964 births
Living people
Novelists from Liverpool
Alumni of Lancaster University
English people of Italian descent
English emigrants to New Zealand
New Zealand people of Italian descent
21st-century New Zealand writers
New Zealand editors
New Zealand magazine editors
New Zealand columnists